Mufti Abdus Sattar Akon (1929 – 6 February 2012) was a teacher, politician and former leader of the Bangladesh Jamaat-e-Islami political party. He was the former Member of Parliament of Bagerhat-4.

Early life and background
Akon was born in 1929, to the Bengali Muslim Akon family of Chalitabunia village in Khaulia Union, Morrelganj, Bagerhat, Bengal Presidency. His father was Alimuddin Akon. Akon first began his education at the Amtali Madrasa in Morrelganj and then at the Tumchar Madrasa in Lakshmipur. He then proceeded to study at the Sarsina Dar us-Sunnat Kamil Madrasa in Nesarabad, Firozpur.

Career
Akon began his career as an Islamic studies teacher. He served as the principal of Bagerhat Alia Madrasa, Nesaria Alia Madrasa in Khulna and Chuadanga Alia Madrasa. In 1969, he became the leader of Jamaat-e-Islami Pakistan's Bakerganj District branch and was later promoted to become the leader of the party's Khulna Division branch in 1970. He had also served as the leader for the party's Bagerhat District branch and was a member of Bangladesh Jamaat-e-Islami's central Shura.

During the 1991 Bangladeshi general elections, Akon represented the party as a candidate for the Bagerhat-4 constituency and was successful. He was elected to parliament for a second-term after the 2001 Bangladeshi general election.

Death and legacy
On 6 February 2012, Akon died as a result of illness at Ibn Sina hospital in Dhaka, Bangladesh. Two days later, his funeral occurred and he was buried at his family graveyard. He left behind three sons and seven daughters.

References

1929 births
2012 deaths
People from Bagerhat District
Bangladesh Jamaat-e-Islami politicians
5th Jatiya Sangsad members
8th Jatiya Sangsad members
Bangladeshi Sunni Muslim scholars of Islam
Muftis